Romano Puppo (25 March 1933 –  11 May 1994) was an Italian stuntman and actor.

Life and career 
Born in Rome, Puppo debuted in 1961 in the Mauro Bolognini's drama Careless, and  after a number of very minor roles he soon became a regular of Italian genre cinema in roles of henchmen and villains. Mainly active in Spaghetti Westerns and Poliziotteschi films, he was also cast as the Paolo Villaggio's antagonist in a number of comedies. He was hired as Lee Van Cleef's stuntman and double stand-in by director Gianfranco Parolini for his Sabata trilogy, and was one of his pallbearers in 1989. He served as his stuntman in a number of films including Sabata (1969), Commandos (1968) along Giampiero Albertini, and The Good, the Bad and the Ugly (1966) along Benito Stefanelli.

Puppo died in a motor scooter accident while having a heart attack, aged 61.

Selected filmography 

 Gli uomini dal passo pesante (1965) - Paine Cordeen
 Agent 3S3: Massacre in the Sun (1966) - Man on Plane #2
 Massacre Time (1966) - Tall Scott Henchman (uncredited)
 The Big Gundown (1966) - Rocky, Widow's Ranchero
 The Good, the Bad and the Ugly (1966) - Slim (Member of Angel Eyes' Gang) (uncredited)
 Death Rides a Horse (1967) - Clell
 Day of Anger (1967) - Hart Perkins (uncredited)
 Seven Times Seven (1968) - Prisoner Carrying Garbage Can (uncredited)
 Gunman Sent by God (1968) - Badman
 Beyond the Law (1968) - Sam - Burton Bandit
 Madigan's Millions (1968) - Steward (uncredited)
 Rita of the West (1968) - Zorro
 Commandos (1968) - Dino
 Death on High Mountain (1969) - Deputy
 Bootleggers (1969) - Boss' Bodyguard
 Sabata (1969) - Rocky Bendato, Stengel Henchman
 Boot Hill (1969) - Finch henchman
 Chuck Moll (1970) - Burt
 Colt in the Hand of the Devil (1970) - Soldier (uncredited)
 Dead Men Ride (1971) - Newman
 Trinity Is Still My Name (1971) - Hitman (uncredited)
 Trinity and Sartana Are Coming (1972) - Captain Bill McCorney (uncredited)
 The Master Touch (1972) - Miller's Lieutenant
 The Sicilian Connection (1972) - Hood (uncredited)
 Il Nemico In Vista (1973) - Commando
 Those Dirty Dogs (1973) - Soldier in Dormitory Fistfight (uncredited)
 Deaf Smith & Johnny Ears (1973) - Bull, Morton's Goon
 The Big Game (1973) - Alberto
 The Funny Face of the Godfather (1973) - Uomo del padrino
 ...E il terzo giorno arrivò il corvo (1973) - Henry Sloane (uncredited)
 Mr. Hercules Against Karate (1973) - Football Player (uncredited)
 Mean Frank and Crazy Tony (1973) - Assassin
 Three Tough Guys (1974) - Hood
 Street Law (1974) - Ringleader
 The Beast (1974) - Dutch Driver
 The White, the Yellow, and the Black (1975) - Kady
 Loaded Guns (1975) - Man in the Tavern (uncredited)
 El clan de los inmorales (1975)
 Cry, Onion! (1975) - Stinky
 Africa Express (1975)
 Lo sgarbo (1975)
 The Loves and Times of Scaramouche (1976)
 Street People (1976) - Fortunate
 The Big Racket (1976) - Doringo
 The Heroin Busters (1977) - Enforcer
 California (1977) - Gary Luke
 Gangbuster (1977) - Peseti Henchman
 Interno di un convento (1978)
 China 9, Liberty 37 (1978) - Zeb / Zeb's brother
 The Uranium Conspiracy (1978) - Boatswain
 Savana - Sesso e diamanti (1978) - Kent
 The Great Alligator River (1979) - Peter
 Speed Cross (1980) - Kurt Schmidbauer
 Contraband (1980) - Enforcer
 Day of the Cobra (1980) - Silvestri
 Speed Driver (1980) - Dave
 Buddy Goes West (1981) - Slim Henchman (uncredited)
 Great White (1981) - Briley (uncredited)
 The Girl from Trieste (1982) - Toni
 2019, After the Fall of New York (1983) - Ratchet
 Escape from the Bronx (1983) - Trash's Father
 Tuareg – The Desert Warrior (1984) - Soldier
 Good King Dagobert (1984) - Argobal
 Who Is Afraid Of Dracula? (1985) - Frankenstein
 Joan Lui (1985) - Assassino
 Scuola di ladri - Parte seconda (1987) - Nostromo
 Robowar (1988) - Cpl. Neil Corey
 Cop Game (1988) - Skipper
 Der Commander (1988) - Angelo
 Ghoulies II (1988) - Zampano
 Sinbad of the Seven Seas (1989) - Captain
 After Death (1989) - Zombie Leader (uncredited)
 Born to Fight (1989) - Alex Bross
 I Won the New Year's Lottery (1989)
 Le comiche 2 (1991) - Ladro (final film role)

References

External links 
 

1933 births
1994 deaths
20th-century Italian male actors
Italian male film actors
Italian male television actors
Male actors from Rome
Male Spaghetti Western actors
Road incident deaths in Italy